MotorMag is a Mauritius car magazine, published monthly, and concentrating on cars and motorcycles testdrives. It was launched in 2007 and is now published by Dubourg Editions Ltd. The magazine features news, road tests and buyers guides of both cars and motocycles. The reviews and news are written mostly in French but sometimes in English also.  It has a cover price of Rs.95 in Mauritius.The MotorMag office is situated in Curepipe, Mauritius.

History
MotorMag magazine was launched in December 2007. It was the first car magazine to be launched in Mauritius.

The team

Publishing Director: Patrick Dubourg

Managing Editor: Stephane Dubourg

Graphic Designer: Anouska Cuniah

Graphic Designer: Jean-Francois Brunet

Photographer: 

Journalists: Frederick Bréville & Mathieu Appassamy

Abonnement:  Shirley Myrthil

Content
Regular features include:
News and market analysis
Green Energy
Testdrives
Automotive manufacturer history
Buyer's guides

References

External links
 MotorMag official website

Automobile magazines
Magazines established in 2007
Magazines published in Mauritius
Monthly magazines